Charles Boniface Mkwasa is a Tanzanian football coach.

Between June 2015 and January 2017, he was the manager of the Tanzania national football team.

References

Living people
Tanzania national football team managers
Year of birth missing (living people)
Tanzanian football managers